Gregoire Lake Estates is a hamlet in northern Alberta, Canada within the Regional Municipality (RM) of Wood Buffalo.

History 
On May 4, 2016, the hamlet was ordered to be evacuated due to the rapid spread of the 2016 Fort McMurray wildfire.

Demographics 

The population of Gregoire Lake Estates according to the 2018 municipal census conducted by the Regional Municipality of Wood Buffalo is 204, a decrease from its 2012 municipal census population count of 275.

See also 
List of communities in Alberta
List of designated places in Alberta
List of hamlets in Alberta

References 

Hamlets in Alberta
Designated places in Alberta
Regional Municipality of Wood Buffalo